Korero Press is a London-based art book publisher. Its list of books mainly includes pop culture, street art, erotica and horror titles. It has published books by contemporary artists Ron English, Patrick J. Jones and Graham Humphreys. Korero Press distribute their books to traditional bricks and mortar bookshops, and sell directly from their website.

Korero Press accepts submissions for publication, but its focus is on lowbrow and pop surrealism, pop culture and art, in particular kustom kulture, illustration, erotica and horror.

The Korero Press website contains interviews with published artists, including Derek Yaniger, Emanuele Taglietti, Roberto Baldazzini, Jim Phillips, Patrick J. Jones and Ron English.

References

External links

Book publishing companies based in London
Companies with year of establishment missing
Publishing companies of the United Kingdom
Visual arts publishing companies